Stefan Nędzyński (1919 – 10 January 2008) was a Polish trade union official and economist.

Born in Poznan, Nędzyński was arrested by Soviet troops at the start of World War II, and spent three years in a labour camp.  He was released in 1941, and served in the Polish Army, fighting in the Middle East and in Italy.

At the end of the war, instead of returning to Poland, Nędzyński moved to England, where he completed a doctorate at the University of London.  He then began working for the Post Office Engineering Union, then in the early 1950s found work with the economics department of the International Confederation of Free Trade Unions (ICFTU).  In 1958, he moved to work for the Postal, Telegraph and Telephone International, soon becoming its assistant general secretary.  He returned to the ICFTU in 1961, directly recruited by its leader, Omer Becu, and made assistant general secretary with responsibility for organisation.

In 1964, Nędzyński returned to the PTTI, as its general secretary.  When Becu retired from the ICFTU in 1967, Nędzyński was a leading candidate to replace him, but George Woodcock vetoed his candidacy, on the grounds that Nędzyński had already quit two jobs with the ICFTU.

Nędzyński remained with the PTTI until his retirement, in 1989.  He then began representing Solidarity overseas.

References

1919 births
2008 deaths
Alumni of the University of London
People from Poznań
Polish military personnel of World War II
Polish trade unionists
Polish emigrants to the United Kingdom